Jakob (or Jacob) Heine (April 16, 1800, Lauterbach, Black Forest, Germany – November 12, 1879, Cannstatt, Germany) was a German orthopaedist. He is most famous for his 1840 study into poliomyelitis, which was the first medical report on the disease, and the first time the illness was recognised as a clinical entity. Poliomyelitis is often known as Heine-Medin disease, after the work of Heine and Karl Oskar Medin.

Heine studied classical languages and theology before turning to medicine, a decision influenced by his uncle, Johann Georg Heine, who owned an orthopaedic institute in Würzburg. He was awarded a doctorate in 1827. In the 1830s, Jakob Heine opened an orthopaedic institution in Cannstatt near Stuttgart and served as director there until 1865. In his institution patients from all over Europe were treated. Heine's special interests were scoliosis, clubfeet and paralysis of arms and legs. He also used washings and gymnastics as a therapy.

One of the sons he had with his wife Henriette Ludovike Camerer (1807–1884, married in 1831) was Carl Wilhelm Heine (1838–1877), one of the most famous European surgeons of the 19th century.

An honorary citizen of Cannstatt, Heine received the titles of Court counselor and Privy counselor, and was raised to the nobility with the Württembergian Order of the Crown.

Heine was also honoured at Warm Springs, Georgia, USA, where his bronze bust can be found along with those of other polio experts and US president Franklin D. Roosevelt in the Polio Hall of Fame.

Further reading 
Hans Hekler: Jakob Heine. Vom König geadelt und in aller Welt geehrt. In: D’Kräz (Beiträge zur Geschichte der Stadt und Raumschaft Schramberg), Heft 10, Schramberg 1990 (also PDF online)
Heinz Hansen: Die Orthopädenfamilie Heine. Leben und Wirken der einzelnen Familienmitglieder im Zeichen einer bedeutenden deutschen Familientradition des neunzehnten Jahrhunderts. doctoral thesis, Dresden 1993.

External links
 
German Biography
Heine honoured at Warm Springs

German orthopedic surgeons
1800 births
1879 deaths
Polio